Post-amendment to the Tamil Nadu Entertainments Tax Act 1939 on 1 April 1958, Gross jumped to 140 per cent of Nett Commercial Taxes Department disclosed 2.28 crore in entertainment tax revenue for the year.

The following is a list of films produced in the Tamil film industry in India in 1961, in alphabetical order.

1961

References 

Films, Tamil
Tamil
1961
1960s Tamil-language films